Miranpur Katra is a Vidhan Sabha constituency in Tehsil Tilhar  in the Indian state of Uttar Pradesh. The town is located 47 kilometres (30 mi) east of the Bareilly, on the main Lucknow–Delhi National Highway 24.Its situated at mid point which is connecting 3 major cities Lucknow-Kanpur-Delhi
Mr.Veer Vikram Singh is the current MLA from BJP.
Mrs. Jamal Fatima  is the current chairperson of Katra.

History
The First Rohilla War of 1773–1774 was a punitive campaign by Shuja-ud-Daula, Nawab of Awadh, against the Rohillas, Afghan highlanders settled in Rohilkhand, northern India. The Nawab was supported by troops  of the British East India Company, in a successful campaign brought about by the Rohillas reneging on a debt to the Nawab.The Rohillas under Hafiz Rahmat Ali Khan were defeated by Colonel Alexander Champion in April 1774. The decisive battle, in which Hafiz Rahmat Khan died, was at Miranpur Katra, Tilhar on 23 April.
Later, for very short period of time, it came under the control of Marathas.

Demographics
 India census Katra Nagar Panchayat population has population of 32,440 of which 17,229 are males while 15,211 are females as per.
Population of Children with age of 0-6 is 4976 which is 15.34% of total population of Katra (NP). In Katra Nagar Panchayat, Female Sex Ratio is of 883 against state average of 912. Moreover Child Sex Ratio in Katra is around 863 compared to Uttar Pradesh state average of 902. Literacy rate of Katra city is 49.42% lower than state average of 67.68%. In Katra, Male literacy is around 56.47% while female literacy rate is 41.47%.

Climate
The city is located in northern plains and experiences humid sub-tropical climate influenced by Kumaon Himalayan weather and monsoon streams. The summers are very hot the monsoon brings most of the rainfall and winter is generally cold with fog and mist in the city. The spring sees a bloom in plants and orchards with dahlias, tulips, chrysanthemum, bougainvillea, roses and sunflowers to bloom. The autumn is much like April.

References

Cities and towns in Shahjahanpur district